Expanding bullets, also known colloquially as dumdum bullets, are projectiles designed to expand on impact. This causes the bullet to increase in diameter, to combat over-penetration and produce a larger wound, thus dealing more damage to a living target. For this reason, they are used for hunting and by most police departments, but are generally prohibited for use in war.  Two typical designs are the hollow-point bullet and the soft-point bullet.

Function and use
Expanding bullets are designed to expand on impact, sometimes as much as twice the diameter. This will slow the bullet down and more of its kinetic energy will be transferred to the target, creating a larger wound channel. For this reason expanding bullets are often used in hunting because their stopping power increases the chance of a quick kill. There are a number of designs used for hunting different game and for use in weapons with different muzzle velocities. Bullets used for medium and large game need better penetration, which means bullets designed to maintain integrity and for less expansion. The velocities at which the bullets hit affect their expansion and penetration.

Expanding bullets are less likely to pass through the target, and if they do, they will exit at a lower velocity. This reduces the risk of accidental injury to bystanders. For this reason, and to maximize the stopping effect, law enforcement organizations use expanding bullets. Even then, some penetration is needed, e.g. to penetrate a windshield or heavy clothing. Such a bullet would have less possibility of penetrating body armour or heavy equipment worn on the body.

Names

Expanding bullets were given the name Dum-dum, or dumdum, after an early British example produced in the Dum Dum Arsenal, near Calcutta, India by Captain Neville Bertie-Clay. There were several expanding bullets produced by this arsenal for the .303 British cartridge, including soft-point and hollow-point designs. These were not the first expanding bullets, however; hollow-point expanding bullets were commonly used for hunting thin-skinned game in express rifles as early as the mid-1870s. Neither was the .303 the first military round with this trait, the old .577 Snider bullet had a hollow core, leaving wounds known for being particularly nasty. The use of the term "Dum-dum" applied to expanding bullets other than the early .303 designs is considered slang by most ammunition and ballistics sources. Manufacturers have many terms to describe the particular construction of the various types of expanding bullets, though most fall into the category of soft-point or hollow-point designs. The expansion itself is sometimes called mushrooming.

Another early name was General Tweedie's "mushroom bullet", cited in The New York Times in 1892.

History

Early bullets were typically made in the form of spheres of nearly-pure lead, which is a soft metal. These would often flatten upon impact with the target, causing a wound larger than the original diameter of the ball. The adoption of rifling allowed the use of longer, heavier bullets, but these were still typically constructed of soft lead and would often double in diameter upon impact. In this case expansion was a side effect of materials, and there is no evidence that the bullets were designed to expand upon impact.

The earliest examples of bullets specifically designed to expand on impact were those fired by express rifles, which were developed in the mid-19th century. Express rifles used larger powder charges and lighter bullets than typical for the time to achieve very high velocities for black powder cartridges. One method of lightening the bullets used was to provide a deep cavity in the nose of the bullet. These were the first hollow-point bullets, and in addition to developing higher velocities, they also expanded significantly upon impact. These hollow-point bullets worked well on thin-skinned game, but tended to come apart on bigger game, resulting in insufficient penetration. One solution to this was the "cruciform expanding bullet", a solid bullet with a cross-shaped incision in the tip. This split section expanded only to the depth of the incision, making it an early form of controlled expansion bullet.

In the late 19th century, the invention of cordite and other nitrocellulose-based "smokeless" propellants permitted higher bullet-velocities than black powder, resulting in flatter trajectories and correspondingly higher hit probabilities. Attempts to limit recoil to an acceptable level led to higher-velocity rounds generally being smaller in diameter and lighter. To prevent lead fouling in the bore caused by the higher pressures and velocities, soft lead bullets were replaced by newly introduced full metal jacket bullets.

However, it soon became apparent that such hard, small-caliber rounds were less effective at wounding or killing an enemy than the older, large-caliber soft lead bullets. Within the British Indian Army, the Dum Dum Arsenal produced a solution: the jacketing was removed from the nose of the bullet, creating the first soft-point bullets. Since the Mark II jacket did not cover the base of the round, this could potentially lead to the jacketing being left in the barrel. This potential problem resulted in the rejection of the Dum Dum design and led to independent development of the Mark III, Mark IV (1897) and Mark V (1899) .303 British rounds, which were of the hollow-point design, with the jacket covering the base; while these were made in Britain, not at the Dum Dum Arsenal, the name "Dum-dum" had already become associated with expanding bullets, and continued to be used to refer to any expanding bullets. The expanding bullets expanded upon impact to a diameter significantly greater than the original .312 inch (7.92 mm) bullet diameter, producing larger diameter wounds than the full-metal-jacketed versions. The Mark IV was successful enough in its first use in the Battle of Omdurman that British soldiers issued with the standard Mark II bullets began to remove the top of the jacket, converting the Mark II bullets into improvised Dum-dum types.

In 1898, the German government lodged a protest against the use of the Mark IV bullet, claiming the wounds produced by the Mark IV were excessive and inhumane, thus violating the laws of war. The protest, however, was based on the comparison of the wounds produced by expanding and non-expanding bullets from high-velocity sporting rifles, rather than on comparison of the expanding .303 British bullets with the previous, large-bore service cartridge it replaced, the .577/450 Martini-Henry. With the energy on impact roughly the same, the wounds caused by the expanding bullet of the .303 were less severe than those caused by the larger-caliber, solid lead bullet used by the Martini-Henry.

The German protests were effective, however, resulting in the ban of the use of expanding bullets in warfare. The British replaced the hollow-point bullets with new full metal jacket bullets, and used the remaining stocks of expanding bullets for practice.

During the Hague Convention of 1899, the majority of the delegates moved to prohibit future usage of expanding bullets, which was opposed by the American and British delegations. Historian Barbara Tuchman wrote that, 

 

However, the rest of the delegates at the 1899 Hague Convention were not persuaded by Ardagh's arguments and voted 22–2 to prohibit the future use of the dumdum bullet.

International law
The Hague Convention of 1899, Declaration III prohibits the use of expanding bullets in international warfare.

The text of the declaration states, "The present Declaration is only binding for the Contracting Powers in the case of a war between two or more of them". Until relatively recently, the prohibition on the use of expanding bullets was applicable only to international armed conflicts between the countries that have signed it. According to the International Committee of the Red Cross's customary international law study, customary international law now prohibits their use in any armed conflicts. This has been disputed by the United States, which maintains that the use of expanding bullets can be legal when there is a clear military necessity. The adoption of an amendment to Article 8 at the Review Conference of the Rome Statute in Kampala (2010) makes the use of expanding bullets in non-international armed conflict a war crime. One example of a war crime involving expanding ammunition is the August 1941 German killing of Soviet prisoners at Zhitomir, as a human experiment with captured Red Army materiel.

Because The Hague Convention applies only to the use of expanding bullets in war, the use of expanding rounds remains legal in other circumstances unless it is restricted or prohibited by local laws. Examples are use of expanding bullets in hunting in which it is desirable to stop the animal quickly, either to prevent loss of a game animal or to ensure a humane death of the animal, and in law enforcement or self-defence, if quickly neutralising an aggressor may be needed to prevent further loss of life or the bullet must remain inside the target to prevent collateral damage.

See also 
 Frangible bullet
 Glossary of firearms terminology
 Hydra-Shok
 Military necessity

References

External links 

 Laws of War: Declaration on the Use of Bullets Which Expand or Flatten Easily in the Human Body; July 29, 1899 Document on International laws of war regarding the expanding bullet
 The .303 British Cartridge, with information on the original Dum-Dum bullet, and the subsequent MK III through MKV hollow-point bullets.
 Dum-Dum Bullet Testing , with tests of dum-dum rounds fired into jugs of water.
 Bullet Impact Comparison, results of bullets designed for different expansion and penetration

Bullets
Paramilitary cartridges